The Yamagata International Documentary Film Festival is a documentary film festival held biennially in Yamagata, Japan.

It was first held in October 1989, which makes it one of the longest running documentary film festivals in the world and the most distinguished such festival in Asia. Its emphasis is on showcasing best achievements in documentary filmmaking, as well as promoting and popularizing the genre and documentary filmmaking in the region.

The festival was most recently held in October 2007. 1,633 films from 109 countries were submitted, with 238 films screened as part of the international and regional competitions. The festival attracted an audience of around 23,000 people. Since 2001, the competition includes films shot in DV. In 1991, a Young Asian Talents section was established.

Awards
A number of prizes are awarded at the festival, including:
 For films in the international competition:
 Robert and Frances Flaherty Prize (The Grand Prize)
 Mayor's Prize (Prize of Excellence)
 Special Jury Prize
 Runner-up Prize
 For films in the regional competition:
Shinsuke Ogawa Award, for new up-and-coming Asian filmmakers
 Overall:
Citizens' Prize, voted for by the festival audiences

Award winners

1989 YIDFF

The first festival edition was held 10–15 October 1989. 
Along with the competition screenings, the festival hosted a retrospective of films by Robert and Frances Flaherty and a comprehensive screening of Japanese documentaries from the first half of the 20th century. In total, 80 films were seen by an audience of around 12,000.

1991 YIDFF

The second festival edition was held 7–13 October 1991. 
Along with the competition screenings, the festival hosted a program devoted solely to Asian films, as well as a selection of Japanese films from the post-WWII period. In total, 153 films were shown, which attracted an audience of around 14,000.

1993 YIDFF

The third festival edition was held 5–11 October 1993. 
Along with the competition screenings, the festival hosted a selection of Asian films, as well as a selection of films focusing on native peoples from North and South America, New Zealand, Australia and Japan. The Shinsuke Ogawa Award for most promising Asian film director in the New Asian Currents program was introduced.  In total, 139 films were shown.  As an illustrative example, one of the official selections, Le pays des sourds (In the Land of the Deaf) focused primarily on Deaf communities in France; but the documentary also featured a brief segment identifying commonalities in French Sign Language and Japanese Sign Language.  The event attracted an audience of around 20,000 people.

1995 YIDFF

The fourth festival edition was held 3–9 October 1995. 
Along with the competition screenings, the festival hosted a retrospective of films from the early days of cinema in honor of  the Lumière brothers' cinematograph centennial. In total, 278 films were shown, which attracted an audience of around 21,000 people.

1997 YIDFF

The fifth festival edition was held 6–13 October 1997. 
In all competitions and programs 187 films were shown, and attendance was around 23,000.

1999 YIDFF

The sixth festival edition was held 19–25 October 1999.
Apart from the usual international and regional competition programs, a retrospective of films by Joris Ivens was shown. 
In total 188 films were shown, and attendance was around 20,000.

2001 YIDFF

The seventh festival edition was held 3–9 October 2001.
Apart from the usual international and regional competition programs, retrospectives of films by Robert Kramer and Fumio Kamei were shown. 
In total 183 films were shown, and attendance was around 18,000.

2003 YIDFF

The eighth festival edition was held 10–16 October 2003.
In total 177 films were shown, and attendance was around 19,000.

2005 YIDFF

The ninth festival edition was held 7–13 October 2005. Apart from the usual regional and international competition programs, the festival screened a selection of films about Zainichi Koreans, as well as screenings of personal documentaries in collaboration with Visions du réel. 
In total 145 films were shown, and attendance was around 20,000.

2007 YIDFF

The tenth festival edition was held 4–11 October 2007. Apart from the usual regional and international competition programs, the festival also screened a program devoted to German documentaries focused on German history. In total 238 films were shown, and attendance was around 23,000.

2009 YIDFF 
October 8–15, 2009

2011 YIDFF 
October 6–13, 2011

2013 YIDFF 
October 10–17, 2013

2015 YIDFF 
October 8–15, 2015

2017 YIDFF
October 5–12, 2017

References

External links
Yamagata IDFF official website

Japanese film awards
Yamagata IDFF
Tourist attractions in Yamagata Prefecture
Film festivals established in 1989